Croxton Park is a  biological Site of Special Scientific Interest south-west of Croxton Kerrial in Leicestershire.

This medieval park has unimproved rough grassland with a scatter of ancient oaks and hawthorns. The breeding birds are diverse, and more than ninety lichen species have been recorded, including many which are uncommon.

A public footpath crosses the site but much of it is private land with no public access.

References

Sites of Special Scientific Interest in Leicestershire